Pacifastacus nigrescens, the sooty crayfish, is an extinct species of crayfish in the family Astacidae. It was originally described in 1857 by William Stimpson from the area around San Francisco, where it was once common in the creeks surrounding San Francisco Bay. The signal crayfish, Pacifastacus leniusculus was introduced to California, probably in the 19th century, and since then, no sightings of P. nigrescens have been made; it is now believed to be extinct. Intensive searches of its former habitat have found that every site where it once occurred is now occupied by either the signal crayfish or Procambarus clarkii.

References

Astacidae
Freshwater crustaceans of North America
Endemic fauna of California
Crustaceans described in 1857
Extinct invertebrates since 1500
Extinct crustaceans
Extinct animals of the United States
Taxa named by William Stimpson